The 1903 Montana football team represented the University of Montana in the 1903 college football season. They were led by first-year head coach Hiram Conibear, and finished the season with a record of two wins and five losses (2–5).

Schedule

References

Montana
Montana Grizzlies football seasons
Montana football